Dóra María Lárusdóttir (born 24 July 1985) is an Icelandic former football player who predominantly played as a winger for Icelandic club Valur. Having played for Valur for a decade and been voted national Player of the Year in 2008 and 2010, Dóra María was for many years one of Iceland's leading female footballers. During her career, she won the Icelandic championship eight times and the Icelandic Cup five times. From 2003 to 2017, Dóra María was part of the Iceland women's national team and she participated at the 2009 and 2013 editions of the UEFA Women's Championship.

Club career
Dóra María spent the 2011 season playing for Djurgårdens IF in Sweden's Damallsvenskan. She scored twice in her 22 league appearances. In January 2012 Dóra María signed for Vitória, of Brazil, where she joined compatriot Þórunn Helga Jónsdóttir.

In March 2022, she announced her retirement from football.

International career

In September 2003 Dóra María made her senior debut for the Iceland national team, in a 10–0 rout of Poland at Laugardalsvöllur during the 2005 UEFA Women's Championship qualification series. She hit Iceland's final goal after entering play as a 71st-minute substitute.

She became a national team regular over the following years, usually playing on the right wing. In qualifying for UEFA Women's Euro 2009, Dóra María scored twice in the 3–0 play-off second leg win over Ireland as Iceland reached their first major international tournament at any level. At the final tournament in Finland, she played in all three group games as Iceland made a first round exit.

National team coach Siggi Eyjólfsson selected Dóra María in the Iceland squad for UEFA Women's Euro 2013 in Sweden.

Honours

Club
Valur
Úrvalsdeild kvenna: 2004, 2006, 2007, 2008, 2009, 2010
Icelandic Women's Football Cup: 2001, 2003, 2006, 2009, 2010

Individual
Úrvalsdeild kvenna Player of the Year: 2008, 2010

References

External links
 
 

1985 births
Living people
Dora Maria Larusdottir
Dora Maria Larusdottir
Djurgårdens IF Fotboll (women) players
Damallsvenskan players
Expatriate women's footballers in Sweden
Expatriate women's footballers in Brazil
Dora Maria Larusdottir
University of Rhode Island alumni
FIFA Century Club
Women's association football wingers
Women's association football fullbacks
Dora Maria Larusdottir
Dora Maria Larusdottir
Rhode Island Rams women's soccer players
Associação Acadêmica e Desportiva Vitória das Tabocas players
Icelandic expatriate sportspeople in Brazil